The Road: Part I is the fifth studio album from British electronic music act Unkle, released on .

Background
The Road: Part 1 is the first UNKLE record in seven years. The album was inspired by James Lavelle's time spent curating the Meltdown Festival at London's Southbank Centre in 2014. Talking about the process of creating the new album, Lavelle said:

Artwork
The artwork for the album was created by German painter Jonas Burgert. The album is accompanied by a 36-page booklet that features artworks by Nathan Coley, John Isaacs, David Nicholson, Norbert Schoerner, Doug Foster, and previous collaborators Warren Du Preez and Nick Thornton Jones.

Track listing

Charts

References

2017 albums
Unkle albums